Indian Battle Park is a park located in the Oldman River valley urban park system of Lethbridge, Alberta. The  park was developed in 1960 and commemorates the Battle of the Belly River held in the area on 24 October 1870 between the Blackfoot and the Cree. A formal peace treaty between the two nations was reached in 1871.

In 2005, a city council bid to rename the park Valley Of Peace (to remove negative references to First Nations) was rejected.

The park is home to Fort Whoop-Up, Helen Schuler Nature Centre and the High Level Bridge.

External links
Indian Battle Park at City of Lethbridge

Parks in Lethbridge
Whoop-Up Trail